Versatone is a brand of musical instrument amplifiers manufactured from a plant in Van Nuys, California during the 1960s and 1970s. Versatone amplifiers were owned, designed and produced by inventor G. Robert Hall and his wife Loretta S.Hall.  Versatone Amplifiers are still owned by Loretta Hall and the rights were never sold off to anyone. 

Its singularity arises from the use of an almost high-fidelity amplification system that rendered good detail in live and recorded applications, its repute as a "secret weapon" among early and current session players, and its rarity in terms of volume of sales.

Models

The best-known Versatone amplifier, the Pan-O-Flex Model 133, used a bi-amplification design with separate power amplifiers for the high and low frequencies. Some versions output through a pair of loudspeakers, an 8-inch and a 12-inch, while other, possibly third-party modifications, show a single 12-inch speaker, mounted in a modified baffle. Notable users of this amplifier included bassists Jack Casady and Carol Kaye. The series of amplifiers including guitar and bass guitar models was noted for its high fidelity (unusual for the time), attention to detail, point-to-point wiring and unique ported and baffled enclosures, and unusual tube sections (with Sylvania 7591 power tubes often used in older Ampeg designs). Later efforts under the name Audio Guild included the guitar-only Grand Prix model, which used a special vibrato circuit licensed from Magnatone, producing a true pitch-shifting effect.

Players
Current users of Audio Guild equipment include producer Jon Brion, session player Stephen Patt, and session player Chris Solberg who played bass using Carol Kaye's Versatone bass amp on such hits as Chris Isaak's "Wicked Game". The instrumental group The Versatones from San Francisco play surf music, television & movie themes through original Versatone guitar and bass amplifiers.

References

Instrument amplifiers